Fight of the Tertia is a 1929 German silent family film directed by Max Mack and starring Max Schreck, Fritz Richard and Fritz Greiner. It is based on the 1928 novel of the same name by Wilhelm Speyer which was later adapted into a 1952 sound film. It was shot at the Terra Studios in Berlin and on location in Friedrichstadt and in the North Sea. The film's art direction was by Hans Jacoby.

Synopsis
Youth gangs clash in a small town on the Baltic Sea.

Cast
Max Schreck as Benno Biersack
Fritz Richard as Magistrate Falk
Fritz Greiner as Schutzmann Holzapfel
Karl Hoffmann as the great elector
Gustl Gstettenbaur as Borst
Rudolf Klein-Rhoden as Bürgermeister von Boestrum
Fritz Draeger as Reppert
August Wilhelm Keese as Otto Kirchholtes
Ilse Stobrawa as Daniela
Aribert Mog as teacher #1
Hermann Neut Paulsen as teacher #2
Erich Schönfelder

Bibliography

External links

1929 films
Films of the Weimar Republic
German silent feature films
Films directed by Max Mack
Films based on German novels
Films set on islands
Films set in the Baltic Sea
Films set in schools
German black-and-white films
Terra Film films
1920s German films
Films shot at Terra Studios